Amphibious Training Base, Castroville also known as Radio Direction Finder Station, Castroville; Naval Radio Station, Castroville; Watsonville Bombing Target Number 8, was a United States Navy military facility located in Castroville, California.

History
US Army Corps of Engineers History opened the base on September 15, 1942. The base provided fleet communication and radio direction finding for the ships off the California Coast during World War 2. This was used by Naval Air Auxiliary Station Watsonville. After the war on 1 July 1945 the base was transferred to the United States Coast Guard. On 14 May 1958 the site was transferred the US Army to test amphibious logistical vehicles.
On 27 June 1973 some of the land became the Salinas River National Wildlife Refuge.

References

Closed installations of the United States Navy
Buildings and structures in Monterey County, California
Monterey County, California articles missing geocoordinate data
Military in California